Anne Norton (born 1954) is an American professor of political science and comparative literature. She is currently the Stacey and Henry Jackson President’s Distinguished Professor at the University of Pennsylvania.

Early life
As a child, Norton lived and traveled throughout the world with her family because her father was an officer in the U.S. Navy.

Academic career
Norton received her B.A. in 1977 and her Ph.D in 1982, both from The University of Chicago. She has held academic positions at University of Notre Dame, Princeton University, and The University of Texas at Austin.

Writings and views
Norton's central intellectual interest has been the meaning and consequences of political identity. She has explored this theme in two books on American politics and one on the concept of political identity itself, drawing on work in the areas of anthropology and semiotics (Norton 1986, 1993, 1988). She has also written a wide-ranging critique of the current practice of the social sciences, particularly political science (Norton, 2004). In 95 Theses, Norton challenges the unreflective ways in which political scientists understand causation and time while ignoring issues of meaning and significance (Larry George, Political Theory vol. 3, no. 3, 2006). Her challenges to mainstream political science have earned her a leadership role in the Internet-based movement to reform political science that has named itself "Perestroika" (Kristen Monroe, Perestroika: The Raucous Rebellion in Political Science, Yale University Press, 2005).

While a student at the University of Chicago, Norton became acquainted with many of the followers of the philosopher Leo Strauss. In the 1990s, the rise of neoconservatism into public consciousness prompted her to write a semi-anecdotal book about the Straussians, titled Leo Strauss and the Politics of American Empire (Yale University Press, 2004). While some have praised the book as a thoughtful account of the intellectual origins of George W. Bush's foreign policy (including Arthur Schlesinger, Jr. in the New York Review of Books, 23 September 2004), it has also received harsh criticism for its author being uninformed about her subject and for spreading mere gossip (see Stanley Hoffman, Foreign Affairs, Nov/Dec 2004, and Charles Butterworth, Review, MIT Electronic Journal of Middle East Studies, 2005). Emphasizing the flaws in Norton’s attempts to define Straussianism and identify Straussians, Peter Minowitz argues that her book is “disgracefully unscholarly.”

She is a founding co-editor of the journal Theory and Event.

References

Norton, Anne, On the Muslim Question. Princeton University Press, 2013.
Norton, Anne. Leo Strauss and the Politics of American Empire. Yale University Press, 2004.
Norton, Anne. Reflections on Political Identity Johns Hopkins University Press, 1988.
Norton, Anne, Alternative Americas University of Chicago Press, 1986.
Norton, Anne, Republic of Signs University of Chicago Press, 1993.
Norton, Anne, Bloodrites of the Poststructuralists Routledge, 2003.
Norton, Anne, 95 Theses on Politics, Culture & Method Yale University Press, 2004.Strauss, Leo, Persecution and the Art of Writing'' University of Chicago Press, reprint edition, 1988.

External links
 Radio Interview with Anne Norton by Scott Horton
 Anne Norton and the “Straussian” Cabal: How Not to Write a Book - review of Leo Strauss and the Politics of American Empire by James Costopoulos in the journal Interpretation
 The Ass and the Lion: Anne Norton, Leo Strauss and the Politics of American Empire - review of Leo Strauss and the Politics of American Empire by David Lewis Schaefer in the journal Interpretation
 

1954 births
Living people
American women political scientists
American political scientists
American political philosophers
University of Chicago alumni
Brown University faculty
University of Notre Dame faculty
Princeton University faculty
University of Texas at Austin faculty
University of Pennsylvania faculty
American women academics
21st-century American women